Air Vice Marshal (retd.) Sultan Mahmud, Bir Uttom is a former chief of Bangladesh Air Force. He is considered as one of the leading person in forming Bangladesh Air force. He is former Deputy chief martial law administrator. He is a former Industries Minister. He received the Independence Day Award from the Government of Bangladesh in 2018.

Career
He was the chief of Bangladesh Air Force from 23 July 1981 to 22 July 1987. On 24 March 1982, he was appointed Deputy chief martial law administrator by President Hussain Mohammad Ershad. He was placed in charge of the Ministry of Industries. He was charged in corruption cases after the government of President Hussain Mohammad Ershad relinquished power.

References

 

Bangladesh Air Force air marshals
Living people
Chiefs of Air Staff (Bangladesh)
Recipients of the Independence Day Award
1944 births
Mukti Bahini personnel